The High Commissioner of the United Kingdom to Barbados and the Eastern Caribbean is the United Kingdom's foremost diplomatic representative in Barbados, and head of the UK's diplomatic mission in Bridgetown, Barbados.

As members of Commonwealth of Nations, diplomatic relations between the United Kingdom and Barbados are at the governmental level, rather than between their heads of state (King Charles III is head of state of the U.K., but not of Barbados which became a republic on 30 November 2021). Thus, the countries exchange high commissioners, rather than ambassadors.

The High Commission in Barbados also covers several other Commonwealth countries in the Eastern Caribbean:
 Antigua and Barbuda (since June 2008);
 The Commonwealth of Dominica;
 Grenada (since 2006);
 The Federation of Saint Kitts and Nevis (passed from Antigua to Barbados in June 2008);
 Saint Lucia;
 Saint Vincent and the Grenadines (since 2007).

List of heads of mission

High Commissioners to Barbados 

 1966–1970: John S. Bennett, CBE, CVO
 1971–1973: Sir David Arthur Roberts, KBE, CMG
 1973–1978: Charles Stuart Roberts, CMG
 1978–1982: James Stanley Arthur, CMG
 1982–1983: John Morrison, 2nd Viscount Dunrossil, CMG
 1983–1986: Sir Giles Bullard, KCVO, CMG
 1986–1990: Kevin Francis Xavier Burns, CMG
 1990–1994: Emrys T. Davies, CMG
 1994–1998: Richard Thomas, CMG
 1998–2001: Gordon M. Baker
 2001–2005: C. John B. White
 2005–2009: Duncan Taylor, CBE
 2010–2013: Paul Brummell
 2013–2017: Victoria Dean
 2017–2020: Janet Douglas

 2021–: Scott Furssedonn-Wood

See also

 List of ambassadors and high commissioners to and from Barbados

References

Further reading 

 A DIRECTORY OF BRITISH DIPLOMATS,

External links 

 UK and Barbados, gov.uk
 

 
Barbados
United Kingdom High Commissioner